Sviblovo is a Moscow Metro station in the Sviblovo District, North-Eastern Administrative Okrug, Moscow. It is on the Kaluzhsko-Rizhskaya Line, between Botanichesky Sad and Babushkinskaya stations.

Design 
Built according to a standard design in 1978, the station features pillars faced with white marble and accented with vertical strips of anodized aluminum. The walls are also white marble and are decorated with friezes containing the names and coats of arms of the various cities and towns surrounding Moscow. Sviblovo's architect was Robert Pogrebnoi.

Entrances 
The entrances to the station are located on either side of Snezhnaya Ulitsa south of the intersection with Amundsena Ulitsa.

Moscow Metro stations
Railway stations in Russia opened in 1978
Kaluzhsko-Rizhskaya Line
Railway stations located underground in Russia